The men's triathlon was an unusual event conducted during the 1904 Summer Olympics.  The International Olympic Committee lists it as part of the Athletics at the 1904 Summer Olympics programme, though other sources list it among the Gymnastics at the 1904 Summer Olympics events.  Gymnasts rather than track and field athletes competed. However, the three events of the triathlon were decidedly athletic rather than gymnastic in nature, comprising the long jump, the shot put, and the 100 yard dash.

118 athletes from 3 nations competed.

The results from this event, as well as the gymnastics triathlon event, were used to determine scores for the gymnastics all-around event. Since 2021 the International Olympic Committee lists the medals won in this event as being part of the sport of Gymnastics Artistic under name "Individual All-Around, Field Sports Men".

Results

Breakdowns of results in the three events are not known.

Totals

References

Sources
 International Olympic Committee results database
 
 

Triathlon
1904 Olympics